Stranger (translit. Jat) is a 2015 Kazakhstani drama film written and directed by Ermek Tursunov. The film was selected as the Kazakhstani entry for the Best Foreign Language Film at the 88th Academy Awards but it was not nominated. It was screened in the Contemporary World Cinema section of the 2015 Toronto International Film Festival.

Cast
 Roza Hairullina as Zina
 Mikhail Karpov as Ibrai
 Erzhan Nurymbet as Iliyas

See also
 List of submissions to the 88th Academy Awards for Best Foreign Language Film
 List of Kazakhstani submissions for the Academy Award for Best Foreign Language Film

References

External links
 

2015 films
2015 drama films
Kazakh-language films
Kazakhstani drama films